Evariquinone is a chemical compound of the anthraquinone class which has been isolated from a sponge-derived strain of the fungus Emericella variecolor and from Aspergillus versicolor.

References

Trihydroxyanthraquinones
Pyrogallols